Dictya is a genus of marsh flies in the family Sciomyzidae. There are at least 20 described species in Dictya.

Species
D. abnormis Steyskal, 1954
D. adjuncta Valley, 1977
D. atlantica Steyskal, 1954
D. atlantica Murphy, 2014
D. bergi Valley, 1977
D. borealis Curran, 1932
D. brimleyi Steyskal, 1954
D. caliente Orth, 1991
D. chihuahua Orth, 1991
D. disjuncta Orth, 1991
D. expansa Steyskal, 1938
D. fisheri Orth, 1991
D. floridensis Steyskal, 1954
D. frontinalis Fisher and Orth, 1969
D. gaigei Steyskal, 1938
D. guatemalana Steyskal, 1954
D. hudsonica Steyskal, 1954
D. incisa Curran, 1932
D. insularis Steyskal, 1954
D. jamaica Orth, 1991
D. knutsomi Orth, 1991
D. laurentiana Steyskal, 1954
D. lobifera Curran, 1932
D. matthewsi Steyskal, 1960
D. mexicana Steyskal, 1954
D. montana Steyskal, 1954
D. neffi Steyskal, 1960
D. orion Orth, 1991
D. orthi Mathis, Knutson & Murphy, 2009
D. oxybeles Steyskal, 1960
D. pechumani Valley, 1977
D. pictipes (Loew, 1859)
D. praecipua Orth, 1991
D. ptyarion Steyskal, 1954
D. sabroskyi Steyskal, 1938
D. sinaloae Orth, 1991
D. steyskali Valley, 1977
D. stricta Steyskal, 1938
D. texensis Curran, 1932
D. umbrarum (Linnaeus, 1758)
D. umbroides Curran, 1932
D. valleyi Orth, 1991
D. veracruz Orth, 1991
D. zacki Orth and Fisher, 1983

References

Further reading

 Diptera.info
 NCBI Taxonomy Browser, Dictya
 

Sciomyzidae
Sciomyzoidea genera